Popatlal Secondary School (PSS) was a co-educational, private, secondary school in the north-eastern Tanzanian city of Tanga. It was one of the oldest schools in the city.

History
The school was established in 1968 and formally opened by President Julius Nyerere, the country's first president.

It was named in the memory of Mr Popatlal Bhanji Laxman, the founder's eldest son, who died in a car accident. Mr. Kulwant Babu Chaudry has been the longest-serving headmaster (1968–2004).

School life

Curriculum
It offers both secondary (O Level) and post-secondary (A Level) education. It runs under the auspices of the Tanga Secondary Education Society.

Notable alumni
Fredrick Gerson Mariki (aka Mkoloni), member of the Wagosi Wa Kaya band.
 Jacob Stephen, Tanzanian actor, director and producer
 Jitu Soni, Member of the 10th Tanzanian Parliament for Babati Rural constituency

References

External links
 
Re-Union 2006 in London

 
Secondary schools in Tanga, Tanzania
Private schools in Tanzania
Educational institutions established in 1968
1968 establishments in Tanzania